Erich Wagler (7 September 1884 in Zwickau – 29 August 1951) was a German ichthyologist and malacologist.

He studied natural sciences in Leipzig and Jena, obtaining his doctorate in zoology at Leipzig in 1912. From 1920 to 1926 he worked as a privat-docent, afterwards serving as a "non-scheduled associate professor" at the University of Leipzig.

Written works 
 Faunistische und biologische Studien an freischwimmenden Cladoceren Sachsens, 1912 - Faunistic and biological studies of free-swimming cladocerans in Saxony.
 Amphipoda der Deutschen Tiefsee-Expedition. 2, Scinidae (1926) - part of the series:  Wissenschaftliche Ergebnisse der Deutschen Tiefsee-Expedition auf dem Dampfer Valdivia 1898/99, 20,6. - Amphipoda from the German Deepsea Expedition of 1898-99, Scinidae. 
 Die Sciniden der deutschen Südpolar-Expedition 1901-1903, 1927 - Scinidae from the German South Pole Expedition of 1901-03.
 Die Tierwelt der Nord- und Ostsee, 1929 (with Georg Grimpe) - Fauna of the North and Baltic Seas.
 Die Coregonen in den Seen des Voralpengebietes - Whitefish native to the lakes of the Alpine region.
 Crustacea (Krebstiere), 1937 - Crustacea.
 Die Tierwelt Mitteleuropas, 1937 (with other authors) - Fauna of Central Europe.

References 

1884 births
1951 deaths
Leipzig University alumni
University of Jena alumni
Academic staff of Leipzig University
People from Zwickau
German ichthyologists
German malacologists
20th-century German zoologists